Mabou is an unincorporated settlement in the Municipality of the County of Inverness on the west coast of Cape Breton Island, Nova Scotia, Canada. The population in 2011 was 1,207 residents. It is the site of The Red Shoe pub, the An Drochaid Museum, and Glenora Distillers

History

The name Mabou is thought to derive from Mi'kmaq name Malabo, shortened from Malabokek, meaning "place where two rivers meet" (the Mabou and Southwest Mabou rivers). It is also thought to mean "Shining Waters" or "Sparkling Waters". In Canadian Gaelic it is called An Drochaid, meaning "The Bridge".

In 1841, the first resident Roman Catholic priest, Maighstir Alasdair Mòr (Fr. Alexander MacDonald, 1801-1865) was assigned to Mabou, where he was seen as, "a veritable chieftain and patron of poets." Fr. MacDonald was also a very near kinsman to many local Gaelic-speaking pioneers, as he was 8th in descent from Iain Dubh MacDhòmhnaill, the 1st Tacksman of Bohuntine for Clan MacDonald of Keppoch.

During the late 19th century and the first half of the 20th century Mabou's primary economic activity centered around a coal mine with several collieries located in the surrounding area. The Inverness and Richmond Railway opened in 1901 to connect the mines in Mabou and Inverness to wharves in Mabou and Port Hastings.

Mining activity ceased following World War II and the railway was abandoned during the late 1980s and is now a snowmobile and ATV trail. Today Mabou is primarily a fishing port for a small fleet of lobster boats. It also hosts a high school serving central Inverness County.

Geography
The community is located at the head of an inlet off the Gulf of St. Lawrence named "Mabou Harbour" and is surrounded by low mountains which are part of the Creignish Hills.

Climate

Famous residents
 Kate Beaton (born 1983), cartoonist and creator of the webcomic Hark! A Vagrant
 Allan The Ridge MacDonald (1794-1868) local pioneer, Seanchaidh, and poet. Highly important figure in both Scottish Gaelic literature and in that of Canadian Gaelic.
 Morgan Murray, author of Dirty Birds (2018)
 The Rankin Family, professional performers of Cape Breton-style Scottish traditional music.

References

External links
 Community website
 Celtic Shores Coastal Trail: snowmobile and ATV trail

Communities in Inverness County, Nova Scotia
Populated places in the Municipality of the County of Inverness, Nova Scotia
General Service Areas in Nova Scotia